Yoewanto Setya Beny (born 3 April 1993) is an Indonesian professional footballer who plays as a goalkeeper for Liga 1 club Barito Putera.

International career 
In 2008, Beny represented the Indonesia U-16, in the 2008 AFC U-16 Championship.

Honours

Club 
PSS Sleman
 Liga 2: 2018

Persija Jakarta
 Menpora Cup: 2021

References

External links
 Yoewanto Beny at Liga Indonesia
 Yoewanto Beny at S.A.D. Indonesia

1993 births
Badak Lampung F.C. players
Indonesian footballers
Arema F.C. players
Persiba Balikpapan players
PSS Sleman players
Liga 1 (Indonesia) players
Association football goalkeepers
Living people
Sportspeople from Malang